Akihiro Koike (born 1 November 1962) is a Japanese rowing coxswain. He competed in the men's coxed four event at the 1984 Summer Olympics.

References

External links
 

1962 births
Living people
Japanese male rowers
Olympic rowers of Japan
Rowers at the 1984 Summer Olympics
Place of birth missing (living people)
Coxswains (rowing)